Mikkel Fossum Basse (born 31 August 1996) is a Danish professional footballer who plays as a midfielder for Danish 1st Division club Fremad Amager.

Career

FC Helsingør
Before joining FC Helsingør, Basse spent his youth career with Lyngby Boldklub before his contract expired in the summer 2016. Basse then went on a trial with Helsingør, where he played four friendly games with the club, before signing a two-year deal on 22 July 2016. Two days later, he got his official debut for the club, playing the first 92 minutes in a 1-0 victory against AB, before getting replaced by Lukas Svendsen.

After 98 games for Helsingør, the club announced on 1 August 2019, that Basse had left the club.

FC Roskilde
On 18 October 2019, Basse joined Danish 1st Division club FC Roskilde on a free agent. He left the club at the end of the year, where his contract expired.

Vendsyssel FF
Vendsyssel FF announced on 21 January 2020, that Basse had joined the club on a contract for the rest of the season. He left the club as his contract expired.

FC Fredericia
On 11 February 2021, Basse signed a deal for the rest of the season with Danish 1st Division club FC Fredericia. In December 2021 it was confirmed, that Basse would leave the club at the end of the month.

Fremad Amager
On 31 January 2022, Basse joined Fremad Amager on a deal until June 2022.

References

External links

Danish men's footballers
1996 births
Living people
Lyngby Boldklub players
FC Helsingør players
FC Roskilde players
Vendsyssel FF players
FC Fredericia players
Fremad Amager players
Danish Superliga players
Danish 1st Division players
Association football midfielders
People from Lyngby-Taarbæk Municipality
Sportspeople from the Capital Region of Denmark